is a Japanese manga series written and illustrated by Hiroto Ida. It began serialization online via Shinchosha's Kurage Bunch website in October 2013 and has since been collected into eight tankōbon volumes. A 4-episode live-action television series adaptation aired between March 6 and 27, 2017 and a live-action film adaptation was released in July 2017, both starring Shotaro Mamiya. An anime television series adaptation by Asahi Production aired from April to June 2018.

Media

Anime
An anime television series adaptation by Asahi Production and CJT aired in 2018. The ending theme is "So Happy", performed by Aya Uchida.

Characters  

Voiced by Gakuto Kajiwara, played by Shotaro Mamiya

Voiced by Jun Kasama

Voiced by Aya Uchida, played by Fumika Baba

References

External links
 

2017 Japanese television series debuts
2017 Japanese television series endings
Anime series based on manga
Asahi Production
Comedy anime and manga
Japanese webcomics
Manga adapted into television series
Nippon TV dramas
Seinen manga
Shinchosha manga
Webcomics in print
Japanese comedy films